Bakhchysarai Raion is one of the 25 regions of Crimea, currently subject to a territorial dispute between the Russian Federation and Ukraine. Population: 

The Bakhchysarai Raion is situated in the southwestern part of the peninsula. Two thirds of the raion's area is mountainous, while the northwestern part of the region is occupied by the coastal plain.

Places of interest
The raion contains a great number of historical landmarks of the ancient history and the Middle Ages history of Crimea, among which are so called cave cities Chufut-Kale, Mangup, and others. The administrative centre of the raion, Bakhchysarai, in the past was a capital of the Crimean Khanate. In addition, the Crimean Astrophysical Observatory is located in the town of Nauchniy.

A few other important attractions located within the raion:
 Bakhchisaray Palace
 The "cave city" of Çufut Qale
 The "cave city" of Eski Kermen
 Mangup
 The "cave city" of Tepe Kermen
 Uspensky Cave Monastery

Footnotes and references

External links

 Local government body

Raions of Crimea